Ute Gertrud Lemper (born 4 July 1963) is a German singer and actress. Her roles in musicals include playing Sally Bowles in the original Paris production of Cabaret, for which she won the 1987 Molière Award for Best Newcomer, and Velma Kelly in the revival of Chicago in both London and New York, which won her the 1998 Olivier Award for Best Actress in a Musical.

Biography
Born in Münster, (Germany), Ute Gertrude Lemper was raised in a Roman Catholic family. She joined the jazz-rock music group known as the Panama Drive Band at the age of 16. Later, she graduated from the Dance Academy in Cologne and the Max Reinhardt Seminary Drama School in Vienna.

Her diverse credits include musicals, such as her breakthrough role in the original Viennese cast of Cats, the title role in Peter Pan, a recreation of the Marlene Dietrich-created Lola in The Blue Angel, the original European Sally Bowles in a Paris production of Cabaret, and Velma Kelly in Chicago (Lemper has played the role of Velma Kelly in Chicago in both London and New York, winning the Laurence Olivier Award for her performance in London). She also dubbed the singing voices of Ariel in Disney's The Little Mermaid and Esmeralda in The Hunchback of Notre Dame for German-speaking audiences.

In 1991, Lemper participated in the Sanremo Music Festival with a song named "The Photograph", written by Italian songwriter Enzo Jannacci. A painter in the neoclassical style, Lemper's paintings have been showcased in numerous galleries.

Lemper, a mother of four, resides on the Upper West Side section of Manhattan in New York City, and performs worldwide. Her autobiography was published in Berlin in 1995; she has also authored several journal articles.

Film and television work
She has contributed to the soundtracks of numerous films, including The Voyager, Kissing Jessica Stein and Appetite.

In 2007, Lemper was a juror in Let's Dance, the German version of Dancing with the Stars.

Recording
Lemper, named Billboard's Crossover Artist of the Year for 1993/1994, is a prolific recording artist, appearing on numerous cast recordings and compilation concerts, including Roger Waters' The Wall concert in 1990. As a solo artist, her extensive discography includes ubiquitously well-reviewed interpretations of Kurt Weill's compositions from the late 1980s, in addition to German cabaret songs, which were very political songs sung in underground locations in 1930s Berlin and elsewhere. She recorded Illusions in 1992, devoted to the songs of Marlene Dietrich and Édith Piaf. She has recorded numerous pop albums, variously in English, French, and German. Punishing Kiss (2000) featured songs written especially for her by the likes of Scott Walker, Nick Cave, Tom Waits, Elvis Costello, Philip Glass, and Neil Hannon, the latter of whom performed with her on two of the album's tracks. Lemper is known for wild interpretations on discs like the Sondheim tribute City of Strangers, containing a particularly mannered version of the Elaine Stritch-popularized song "The Ladies Who Lunch". In 1998, a Lemper compilation, All That Jazz: The Best of Ute Lemper, was released. In 2003 and 2006, Lemper's songwriting talents were shown on her discs from those years as she moved from being an interpretive singer to a singer-songwriter.

Discography
 Cats (original German cast recording, 1983)
 Ute Lemper singt Kurt Weill (1987)
 Life is a Cabaret (1987)
 Ute Lemper Sings Kurt Weill (1988)
 Starlight Express (original German cast recording, 1988)
 Crimes of the Heart (1989)
 Die Dreigroschenoper (1990)
 The Seven Deadly Sins (1990)
 The Wall – Live in Berlin by Roger Waters - Sings on The Thin Ice and The Trial (1990)
 Arielle, die Meerjungfrau (1990)
 Prospero's Books (1991)
 Ute Lemper Live: Ihre Großen Tournee-Erfolge (1991)
 The Michael Nyman Songbook (1991)
 Homo Faber (1991)
 Guarda La Fotografia (1991)
 Illusions (1992)
 Komisch' Wetter (1992)
 Ute Lemper Sings Kurt Weill – Volume 2 (1993)
 Espace Indécent (1993)
 Portrait of Ute Lemper (1995)
 City of Strangers: Songs by Sondheim, Prévert... (1995)
 Die Eisprinzessin (1995)
 Der Glöckner von Notre-Dame (1996)
 Berlin Cabaret Songs (versions in English and German, 1996/1997)
 Nuits Étranges (1997)
 All That Jazz: The Best of Ute Lemper (1998)
 Chicago (London cast recording, 1998)
 Kurt Gerrons Karussell (1999)
 Punishing Kiss (2000)
 But One Day... (2002, Decca/Universal Classics)
 Blood & Feathers: Live from the Café Carlyle (2005)
 Between Yesterday and Tomorrow (2009)
 Paris Days, Berlin Nights (2012)
 Forever: The Love Poems of Pablo Neruda (2013)
 The 9 Secrets (based on texts from Paulo Coelho's book "Manuscript Found in Accra") (2015)
 Rendezvous With Marlene (2020)

Filmography

Film

References

External links

 
 Interview on Australian Radio – Interview on SBS Radio
 
 
 Video including Lemper's performance as Ariel
 Ute Lemper performs "The Saga of Jenny" by Kurt Weill and Ira Gershwin (public domain)
 Ute Lemper German Interview with Pictures

1963 births
20th-century German actresses
21st-century German actresses
Cabaret singers
German expatriates in the United States
20th-century German women singers
21st-century German women singers
German film actresses
German musical theatre actresses
German stage actresses
German Roman Catholics
Laurence Olivier Award winners
Living people
People from Münster
Theatre World Award winners
Torch singers